Jahanabad (also Romanized as Jahānābād and Jehānābād; also known as Jahānābād-e Afshārīeh and Jahānābād-e Afshārīyeh) is a village in Ramand-e Shomali Rural District, Khorramdasht District, Takestan County, Qazvin Province, Iran. At the 2006 census, its population was 1,035, in 265 families.

References 

Populated places in Takestan County